The 2002 congressional elections in New Hampshire were held on November 5, 2002 to determine who will represent the state of New Hampshire in the United States House of Representatives.  It coincided with the state's senatorial elections. Representatives are elected for two-year terms; those elected served in the 108th Congress from January 2003 until January 2005.  New Hampshire has two seats in the House, apportioned according to the 2000 United States Census.

Overview

References

2002
New Hampshire
2002 New Hampshire elections